|}

The Solonaway Stakes is a Group 2 flat horse race in Ireland open to thoroughbreds aged three years or older. It is run at Leopardstown over a distance of 1 mile (1,609 metres), and it is scheduled to take place each year in September.

The event is named after Solonaway, the winner of the Irish 2,000 Guineas in 1949, and was previously run at The Curragh. It was contested over a mile during the late 1980s and early 1990s, and for a period it was classed at Listed level. It was extended by a furlong in 1993.

The Solonaway Stakes reverted to a mile in 2001, and was given Group 3 status in 2007.  It was upgraded to Group 2 status from 2014, and in the same year it was transferred to Leopardstown and became part of the Irish Champions Weekend fixture. The race is currently sponsored by Clipper Logistics, and run as the Clipper Logistics Boomerang Mile.

Records

Most successful horse since 1987 (2 wins):
 Jumbajukiba – 2007, 2008

Leading jockey since 1987 (4 wins):
 Johnny Murtagh – Julie la Rousse (1991), Ger's Royal (1996), Scottish Memories (1999), Steinbeck (2010)

Leading trainer since 1987 (6 wins):
 Aidan O'Brien – Risk Material (1998), Shoal Creek (2000), Troubadour (2004), Ivan Denisovich (2006), Steinbeck (2010), I Can Fly (2018)

Winners since 1987

See also
 Horse racing in Ireland
 List of Irish flat horse races

References

 Racing Post:

 galopp-sieger.de – Solonaway Stakes.
 horseracingintfed.com – International Federation of Horseracing Authorities – Clipper Logistics Boomerang Stakes (2018).
 pedigreequery.com – Solonaway Stakes – Curragh.

Flat races in Ireland
Curragh Racecourse
Open mile category horse races
Leopardstown Racecourse